Saccharophagus degradans (formerly Microbulbifer degradans) is a gram-negative marine bacterium known to degrade a number of complex polysaccharides as energy source. S. degradans have also been shown to ferment xylose to ethanol. In recent studies, Saccharophagus degradans from Chesapeake Bay was effectively used to produce cellulosic ethanol. Cellulosic ethanol production by means of bacterial action could be the key cheap production of cellulosic ethanol for global mass market production of bioethanol. It is currently produced by such means as gasification. S. degradans is the only species in its newly created genus.

References

External links
Type strain of Saccharophagus degradans at BacDive -  the Bacterial Diversity Metadatabase

Alteromonadales
Bacteria described in 2005